Ihram clothing (Ahram clothing) includes men's and women's garments worn by Muslim people while in a state of Iḥrām, during either of the Islamic pilgrimages, Ḥajj and/or ʿUmrah. The main objective is to avoid attracting attention. Men's garments often consist of two white unhemmed sheets (usually towelling material) and are universal in appearance. The top (the ridāʾ) is draped over the torso, and the bottom (the izār) is secured by a belt; plus a pair of sandals. Women's clothing, however, varies considerably and reflects regional as well as religious influences, but they often do not wear special clothing or cover their faces.

White ihram clothing is intended to make everyone appear the same, to signify that in front of God there is no difference between a prince and a pauper. Ihram also contributes to a feeling of unity that pilgrims have when they are in the city of Mecca, that they are all brothers and sisters joined to worship Allah. Although it is simply an item of clothing to be worn during the pilgrimage, there are many competing views on the proper wearing of ihram. For example, the exact number of days a pilgrim is required to wear ihram varies according to the type of pilgrimage the individual is performing. Ihram is typically worn during Dhu al-Hijjah, the last month in the Islamic calendar.

Ihram is also a state which a pilgrim is in during the Hajj pilgrimage. Before entering Ihram, they bathe, trim their nails and hair, make wudu (cleansing ritual), and pronounce a formal intention to perform Hajj. While they are in this state, pilgrims are not allowed to hunt or kill any living thing, participate in sexual intercourse, cut hair or nails, or wear make-up or perfume.

See also
 Islamic clothing
 Izaar
 Sarong a waist-wrap similar to the izar

References

External links

 How to Wear the Ihram for Umrah & Hajj (YouTube)
 How to Wear Ihram
 How to Tie Ihram Properly
 طريقة لبس الإحرام - الشيخ أكرم الحميدي (in Arabic)

Islamic clothing
Tops (clothing)
Hajj
Hajj terminology